This article outlines the grammar of the Dalmatian language.

Alphabet 
A B C D E F G H I J K L M N O P Q R S T U V X Z

Nouns 
A Dalmatian noun has a gender (masculine or feminine) and is inflected for number (singular or plural). The plural is formed with the ending -i for masculine and -e for feminine nouns.

Articles 

Examples:
  – one house, a house
  – one man, a man

The definite article for masculine nouns is el in singular and i in plural. The definite article for feminine nouns is la in singular and le in plural. Before place names in the dative case, the articles are used in the forms in tel, in tela, in teli and in tele or abbreviated as nel, nela, neli and nele.

Examples:
  – What is it?
  – It is a house.
  – Where is the house?
  – The house is in the city.
  – Where is the tree?
  – The tree is in the wood.

Adjectives 
The adjectives are used before nouns and also have masculine and feminine gender and singular and plural number.

Examples:
Maura kuosa – Big house
La maura kuosa – The big house
Briv kavul – Fast horse
El briv kavul – The fast horse

Pronouns

Personal pronouns

Nominative 
Singular

Plural

Oblique 
Singular

Plural

Possessive 
Singular

Plural

Prepositions 
 in – in
 bas de – below
 de – of
 da – from, of
 dri – behind
 saupra – on
 alič – at

Verbs 
The Dalmatian language does not distinguish between the continuous and simple forms. The present tense is formed from the personal pronoun, the infinitive stem, and the present endings:

Singular
-a, -uo
-e
-a, -uo

Plural
-aime
-aite
-a, -uo

Example:  (to speak)

Singular
 (I speak, I am speaking)
 (Thou speakest, thou art speaking)
 (He speaks, he is speaking)

Plural
 (We speak, we are speaking)
 (Ye speak, ye are speaking)
 (They speak, they are speaking)

The past tense is formed from the personal pronoun, the infinitive stem, the suffixes -ua or -oua, and the present endings.

Singular
 (I was speaking, I spoke)
 (Thou wast speaking, thou spokest)
 (He was speaking, he spoke)

Plural
 (We were speaking, we spoke)
 (Ye were speaking, ye spoke)
 (They were speaking, they spoke)

The future tense is formed from the infinitive form (ending in -ar, -ur, or -ro) and the future endings:

Singular
-e
-e
-e

Plural
-me
-te
-e

Examples:

Singular
 (I shall speak)
 (Thou wilt speak)
 (He will speak)

Plural
 (We shall speak)
 (Ye will speak)
 (They will speak)

The passive is formed from the past participle (ending in -ait, -oit, or -uat) and the prefixes joi or jai.

Examples:
 (is born)
 (is frozen)
 (is cut)

The Dalmatian language has also a conditional form:

Last night it was so cold, and all water has been frozen.

The imperative is formed from the infinitive stem and endings:
-ai – second person singular
-aite – second person plural

Examples:
duai! – give!
vedai! – look!

The imperative can also be formed from the imperative form of the verb "to be" and the infinitive:
Saime vedar – Let us go
Sait fuot – Let it be

The verb "to be":

Infinitive: Saite

Singular
Ju sai
Te sante
Jal sant

Plural
Nu saime
Vu saite
Jali sant

Adverbs 
Adverbs of place and direction:
luc – here
cauc – there
sois – upwards
sote – under
dri – behind

Adverbs of time:
aninč – before
dapu – after
diatremun – then
junkaura – against, still
adias – now

External links
 http://dalmatianlanguage.yolasite.com/

Italic grammars
Dalmatian language